Christian Scharnweber (born 1972) is a German electronic music producer and DJ. He records under the name DJ Mellow D and Mellow Trax; it is under this name that he had his hits.

His first song, Phuture Vibes, was a domestic hit, charting at #15 on the Austrian Singles Chart. However, his next song, "Outa Space", was an international smash, charting at #14 in Austria as well as #42 in Switzerland, #27 in France, #41 on the UK Singles Chart and #43 on the Hot Dance Music/Maxi-Singles Sales chart in the US. His final hit, coming two years later, was a remix of Shaft's "(Mucho Mambo) Sway", which charted at #43 in Austria.

Discography

References 

German DJs
1972 births
Living people
Electronic dance music DJs